Bektaş or Bektash is a Turkic name.

 Cansu Bektaş
 Emina Bektas (born 1993), American tennis player
 Haji Bektash Veli, the founder of the Bektashi order
 Bektash of Kakheti (died 1615), Safavid military leader
 Bektash Khan Mirimanidze (died 1639), Safavid governor
 Bektashi Order, an Islamic Sufi order founded in the 13th century
 Habib Bektaş (born 1951), Turkish-German writer
 Bektaş Demirel (born 1976), Turkish judoka
 Bektaş, Ayvacık, a village in western Turkey
 Bektaş, Giresun, a highland (yayla) in Giresun Province, Turkey
 Bektaş, Vezirköprü, a village in northern Turkey